Civic Area (AC) was a progressive political party in Italy.

Led by Giulio Santagata, a former minister in Romano Prodi's second government, AC was mainly composed of former Olivists, a faction of Prodi's loyalists within Democracy is Freedom and, subsequently, the Democratic Party (PD).

In December 2017 AC formed, along with the Italian Socialist Party, the Federation of the Greens and Progressive Area, the Together electoral list, within the centre-left coalition, for the upcoming 2018 general election.

In the election the list obtained a mere 0.6% of the vote and no seats. However, Serse Soverini (AC) was elected to the Chamber from the single-seat constituency of Imola, Emilia-Romagna.

In October 2018 Soverini joined Italia in Comune and soon became the party's regional coordinator in Emilia-Romagna. In September 2019, after Matteo Renzi had left to form Italia Viva, Soverini joined the PD.

References

2017 establishments in Italy
2018 disestablishments in Italy
Political parties established in 2017
Political parties disestablished in 2018
Defunct political parties in Italy
Democratic Party (Italy) breakaway groups
Progressive parties
Pro-European political parties in Italy